Ginger Williams (born 1953) is a Jamaican-born British lovers rock singer who was one of the earliest exponents of the genre.

Career
Born in Jamaica in 1953, Williams moved with her family to London in 1962. She joined the group Green Mango in her mid-teens and embarked on a solo career after meeting producer Ronnie Williams. She worked with Williams on her debut single "I Can't Resist Your Tenderness", considered one of the earliest lovers rock releases, which topped the British reggae charts. This was followed by "In My Heart There Is A Place", which was also reggae chart success. She went on to work with producer Dennis Harris on "Tenderness" and began a long working relationship with Bill Campbell, releasing "Oh Baby Come Back", "I'll Still Love You", "I'm Just A Girl", and a duet they recorded together, "The Vow". Her debut album, Strange World, was released in 1977. She continued to have occasional hits on the reggae charts and in 1996 the compilation album The First Lady of Lovers Rock was released.

Discography

Albums
Strange World (1977), BB
Love Me Tonight (1990), Cougar
Cool Loving, B&B

Compilations
I Can't Resist Your Tenderness, Rover - Ginger Williams and Various Artists
Greatest Hits: The First Lady of Lovers Rock (1996), World Sound

Singles
"I Can't Resist Your Tenderness" (1975), Paradise
"Oh Baby Come Back", BB
"I Still Love You" (1976), BB
"The Vow" (1976), BB - with Bill Campbell
"I'm Just a Girl", BB
"In My Heart There's a Place", Paradise
"Your Love Is Driving Me Crazy", Paradise

References

1956 births
Living people
British reggae singers

External links
Oral History Interview with Ginger Williams, recorded by Hackney Museum in 2019.